The Abdul Gaffoor Mosque is a mosque in Little India, Singapore. It is located at Dunlop Street in the Rochor Planning Area.

The mosque was constructed in 1907, and major restoration of the building was completed in 2003. The mosque is currently owned by Majlis Ugama Islam Singapura (MUIS).

The mosque is also known by the following variant names: Abdul Gafoor Mosque, Abdul Gafor Mosque, Abdul Gaffor Mosque, Abdul Gaphore Mosque, Abdul Gapore Mosque, Dunlop Street Mosque and Indian Mosque.

History
Masjid Abdul Gaffoor is located in the area known as Kampong Kapor, which was an active business hub for Indian merchants and for those who worked at the old race course at Farrer Park. The mosque on this site was originally a building with timber partitions and a tiled roof known as Masjid Al-Abrar, built in 1846 to serve the religious needs of the South Indian Muslim merchants and Baweanese syces and horse trainers residing in Kampong Kapor.

In 1881, a deed of assignment dated 14 November 1881 created the Dunlop Street Mosque Endowment or wakaf. The two trustees were Ismail Mansor and Shaik Abdul Gaffoor bin Shaik Hydert. Abdul Gaffoor was chief clerk at a legal firm. The wakaf was created for the building of a mosque for the Muslim community in Singapore. The deed of assignment also placed in trust several other properties including a Muslim burial ground and a house in Race Course Road. The burial ground was closed in 1921.

In 1887, as mosque trustee, Shaik Abdul Gaffoor applied to construct shophouses and sheds on the land around the original mosque. More shophouses were added in 1903. The rental of these buildings generated income which then went towards building the new mosque.

Building began in 1907 and it appeared to have taken quite a few years for the mosque to be completed because its completion date is not known. In 1910, when the new mosque was partially completed, the old mosque was demolished. When Shaik Gaffoor died in 1919, it was apparently still not completed. After his death, his son took over the management of the mosque and the wakaf properties. In 1927, the Dunlop Street Endowment was taken over by the Muslim and Hindu Endowments Board. The building was presumably complete then.

Today, the mosque stands facing a row of shophouses that are now used for Qur'an classes and other subjects, as well as for communal activities.

Masjid Abdul Gaffoor was gazetted as a national monument on 13 July 1979.

Architecture
Although the wakaf was beleaguered by problems, the resulting Masjid Abdul Gaffoor is rich in architectural features.

Features
The prayer hall is raised above the ground and surrounded with verandahs at the entrance and sides. It is oriented towards Mecca and thus skewed away from the lot lines and the street.
The verandahs are enclosed by a balustrade with circular and lancet-shaped openings and framed by repetitive cinquefoil arches double-framed with heavy mouldings. The bays are marked out with pilasters with ornate capitals. The wide openings give the interior an airiness that contrasts with the heavy columns in the centre of the prayer hall.
On either side of the main entrance are two graduated cinquefoil arched openings. The larger ones are nearest the entrance, while the smaller ones are further away.
The main entrance to the prayer hall is pedimented with an elaborate sundial in which the 25 rays of the sunburst are done in calligraphy. The sundial is flanked on either side by a series of pilasters and columns in miniature. The pediment above the sundial is shaped like an onion dome. The two square minarets on the left and right are complete with miniature columns and arches.
There are panels with calligraphic inscriptions in several places in the mosque, including over the entrance.
The interior of the cupola at the centre of the prayer hall is supported by four large cluster columns that form semicircular arches. Square and round calligraphic inscriptions decorate the interior of the cupola.
The cluster columns that hold up the cupola have elaborate mouldings and capitals.
From the exterior, the cupola emerges from the roof deck as a hexagonal-shaped tower that is divided into three levels and marked out with Doric pilasters.
On the first level of the tower are eight cinquefoil windows with coloured glass panes that let light through to the interior. These windows are ornamented with recessed mihrab-shaped moulding and cinquefoil arches.
The second level has pilasters and capitals and is topped by a balustrade with bottleneck balusters.
There are minarets at the corners of the hexagon. These minarets are crowned with onion-shaped domes with a crescent moon and a star at the pinnacle. The very centre of the hexagon is crowned with a large onion dome topped with a smaller onion dome. On the pinnacle is a star and crescent moon.
The corners of the front verandah have simpler and less elaborate cupolas.
The four corners of the building are anchored by large Corinthian columns in a cluster with elaborate capitals in a leaf design. The interior and exterior of the mosque have several types of columns and pilasters. They are both structural and ornamental and range from Doric to Corinthian. Columns can be paired with pilasters and pilasters are inset into columns.
The mihrab is plain. There is a narrow rectangular panel with a quotation from the Qur'an above it. Next to the mihrab is the minbar, a three-step timber staircase from which the imam leads prayers.
Above the prayer hall is a flat roof deck surrounded by a parapet wall with bottle-shaped balusters. It is topped with a line of 22 small six-level minarets crowned with onion domes, each with a crescent moon. The miniature minarets rise from the pilasters that frame the cinquefoil arched openings below

There is also a type of single-leafed window that is recessed and framed by an elaborate cinquefoil arch. It is flanked with pilasters and pedimented and has the same star-and-crescent pattern of the larger arched openings.
The ablution area in this mosque was originally a pool. This was later drained and a modern wash area put in. It is located outside at the southwest end of the mosque.

Transportation
The mosque is accessible from Rochor MRT station, Exit B.

See also
 Islam in Singapore

References 

Lee Geok Boi (2002), The Religious Monuments of Singapore, Landmark Books, 
National Heritage Board (2002), Singapore's 100 Historic Places, Archipelago Press, 
Preservation of Monuments Board, Know Our Monuments

External links

Majlis Ugama Islam Singapura, MUIS (Islamic Religious Council of Singapore)
List of Mosques in Singapore managed by MUIS : Masjid Abdul Gaffoor
 YourSingapore website

Mosques completed in 1907
Abdul Gaffoor
Tourist attractions in Singapore
Landmarks in Singapore
National monuments of Singapore
Rochor
Indian diaspora in Singapore
20th-century architecture in Singapore